Anita Kyarimpa better known as Anita Fabiola is a Ugandan actress, tourism ambassador, Event host, business woman, and former beauty queen. In February 2019 she was appointed as a Goodwill Tourism ambassador headlining the "Tulambule" campaign in liaison with the Uganda Tourism Board to promote tourism all over Uganda. Prior to hosting the Be my date show on NTV in 2014, Fabiola became Miss Uganda West and the first runner-up in the overall Miss Uganda beauty pageant in 2013. She is also known for hosting some of the Africa's biggest red carpet events. These include Africa Magic Viewer's Choice Awards in Nigeria (2016), Namibia Annual Music Awards (2016 and 2017), Ghana Movie Awards 2017, Ghana Music Awards 2016, Glitz Awards Ghana 2017, Abryanz Style and Fashion Awards 2016 among others.

Career
At the age of 12 she was a model at the Arapapa modelling agency. During this time, she did catwalks and commercials for Flair Magazin in 2008. While in high school, Fabiola participated in the school's beauty pageants which earned her titles like, Miss London College, Miss St. Lawrence schools and colleges. This led her to participate in the nationwide, Miss High School Kadanke in 2012 which she won, making her the first "Miss Kadanke."

In 2013, Fabiola participated in the Miss Uganda beauty pageant and she was crowned Miss Uganda West and became the First runner first runner-up in the overall Miss Uganda beauty pageant in 2013

Fabiola kick-started her career in television in 2014 by hosting and producing the Be my date show on NTV which aired out every Sunday at 8 pm. In 2014 the show was voted the most watched entertainment television programme in Uganda. As a result, the show's success, Fabiola received nominations and eventually won the 2015 Buzz Teeniez Awards for the Best Female TV personality.

In 2015, Fabiola had a short time working as a presenter on Capital FM every Mon-Friday on the Big Breakfast from 6 am to 10 am.

As an actress, Fabiola is best known for her role as Angella in NTV's remake of the telenovela drama series, Second Chance that was released in October 2016 on the same station. However, due to a very busy schedule, she left the show to pursue other lucrative business interests across the globe. Fabiola also played a supporting role in the 2015 series Studio 256 also on NTV. She also starred in the 2013 Bollywood Malayalam thriller, Escape from Uganda as Oldra.

Fabiola is currently the host of the live hit Music and entertainment show, "Katch Up" that airs every Friday on NBS TV.

Fabiola has also hosted a number of events on the Ugandan entertainment scene including Hip Hop Awards 2016, Uganda Entertainment Awards 2017, Miss Uganda 2016, Tekno and MR. Eazi concert, Belaire launch among others.

In 2018, became the first Ugandan to be invited to the prestigious Cannes Film Festival and also walked the red carpet at the celebrity filled event.

She also launched her weekly podcast, "The Fabiola Podcast" on Afripods, an online channel and App from Sweden. After this, she became the first Ugandan media personality to own and host her own podcast.

In February 2019, she was unveiled as a Tourism ambassador involved in the "Tulambule", a tourism campaign aimed at promoting local tourism in Uganda. Together with a team of fellow celebrity ambassadors that included Salvador (Patrick Idringi), Gaetano Kaggwa, Marcus Kwikiriza and  kickboxer Moses Golola, the team traversed various parts of the country exploring not just the panoramic landscape but also different unique Cultures and traditions while encouraging fellow Ugandans to do the same.

Endorsements 
Fabiola's successful career has attracted several brands that she has endorsed. She has been the brand ambassador for several brands like, CAT footwear, Paramour Cosmetics, Lux Belaire, Virginia Black MTN Pulse, Jumia Uganda, Lauma Uganda among others

Achievements and recognition

Philanthropy 
Fabiola founded the Fab Girls Foundation with the goal of empowering young girls through providing services like basic education, sanitation, creating HIV/AIDS awareness among others. At the start of 2019, she launched a campaign, selling her custom designed calendars in a bid to raise money for her charity.

Family 
Fabiola married Mark Ronald Mukiibi in a private traditional marriage ceremony known as okugamba obugyenyi in 2022 after his proposal in 2021 in the Maldives.

References

Living people
1994 births
People from Kampala
21st-century Ugandan actresses
Ugandan beauty pageant winners
Child models
Ugandan television actresses